Johanna Hendrika Pieneman (1889-1986) was a Dutch artist.

Biography 
Pieneman was born on 17 February 1889 in Amsterdam. Her brother, Nicolaas Pieneman (1880-1938), was also a painter. She studied at the Dagtekenschool voor meisjes (Day drawing school for girls) and the Rijksakademie van beeldende kunsten (State Academy of Fine Arts) in Amsterdam. Her teachers included , Antoon Derkinderen, Wilhelmina Cornelia Kerlen, and Nicolaas van der Waay. Her work was included in the 1939 exhibition and sale Onze Kunst van Heden (Our Art of Today) at the Rijksmuseum in Amsterdam.

Pieneman died  on 28 April 1986 in Amsterdam.

References

External links
images of Pieneman's work on Simonis & Buunk

1889 births
1986 deaths
Artists from Amsterdam
20th-century Dutch artists